The 1963–64 Women's Basketball European Cup was the 6th edition of the competition. Daugava Riga defeated Spartak Sokolovo Prague in the final to win its fourth European Cup, having previously overcome defending champion Slavia Sofia in the semifinals. With a 103–101 aggregate it was the tightest final so far. This tournament marked the beginning of Daugava's hegemony in the European Cup, which was continuing the following eleven editions.

14 teams took part in the competition, with Belgium and Netherlands making their first appearance. Portugal, represented by Benfica de Lubango from Portuguese Angola, retired from the competition.

Qualification round

Round of 16

Quarter-finals

Semi-finals

Final

References

External links 
 Results in Todor66.com

Champions Cup
European
European
EuroLeague Women seasons